George Kwabena Obeng Takyi (born 29 March 1965) is a chartered accountant and currently a member of the Eighth Parliament of the Fourth Republic of Ghana for Manso Nkwanta Constituency in the  Ashanti Region.

Early life and education 
Takyi was born 29 March 1965 at Mpatuam, in Amansie West District since 1988. He has MBA in Chartered Accountancy, Business Communication. He also have a PhD candidate in the area of Accounting, Finance and Taxation.

Career 
Prior to entering politics, Takyi worked as a lecturer at the Kumasi campus of University of Education, Winneba.

Political Life 
He is a member of the New Patriotic Party and currently the member of parliament for the Manso Nkwanta Constituency in the Ashanti Region. He won the NPP Parliamentary primaries for the Manso Nkwanta seat against Joseph Albert Quarm. He subsequently contested against Bance Musah Osmane, an NDC candidate in the December 2020 election. Takyi had 34,408 votes making 76.1% of the total votes cast to win the Manso Nkwanta Constituency seat on the ticket of the New Patriotic Party (NPP) whilst the NDC parliamentary aspirant had 10,798 votes making 23.9% of the total votes cast.

Committees 
He is a member of the Government Assurance Committee and also  member of the Food, Agriculture and Cocoa Affairs Committee.

Personal life 
He is a Christian.

Philanthropy 
In February 2021, he presented some school uniforms and PPE to some schools in the Manso Nkwanta Constituency in the Ashanti Region.

References 

Academic staff of the University of Education, Winneba
Ghanaian accountants
Ghanaian MPs 2021–2025
New Patriotic Party politicians
1965 births
Living people